Fluorenone is an aromatic organic compound with the chemical formula C13H8O. It is bright fluorescent yellow in color and is a solid at room temperature. 

It can be synthesised from fluorene with the addition of glacial acetic acid and sodium hypochlorite solution, undergoing an oxidation reaction.

Several substituted fluorenones are biologically active as antibiotic, anticancer, antiviral, or neuromodulatory compounds. 

Some substituted azafluorenones are biologically active, such as the naturally occurring antimicrobial compound onychine (1-methyl-4-azafluorenone). The compound 1,8-diazafluoren-9-one is used for fingerprint detection.

See also
 Fluorenol
 Chlorflurenol

References

External links
Material Safety Data Sheet

 
Designer drugs